is a Shinto shrine in the Ichinomiya neighborhood of the town of Ichinomiya in Chōsei District, Chiba Prefecture, Japan. It is the ichinomiya of former Kazusa Province. The main festival of the shrine is held annually on September 13, and features kagura performances, which are listed as an Intangible Cultural Property of Chiba Prefecture

Enshrined kami
, the mother of Emperor Jimmu and daughter of the sea-dragon god Watatsumi

History
The origins of Tamasaki Jinja are unknown. The shrine is located in an area of the Bōsō Peninsula with a favorable climate, which has been settled since at least the Jōmon period. Shell middens and burial mounds are common in the area. Its earliest appearance unhistorical documentation is an entry date 868 in the Ruijū Kokushi followed by the Nihon Sandai Jitsuroku in 877. The shrine is mentioned as the ichinomiya of Kazusa Province in the Engishiki records from the early Heian period. However, repeated fires and other disasters over the centuries have destroyed all of the old shrine records and buildings. The shrine was burned down in 1562 during a battle involving the Satomi clan and was rebuilt by the Satomi in 1587. Additional structures were donated by Tokugawa Ieyasu in 1591 and the shrine reconstructed in 1687. During the Meiji period, the shrine was designated as a  under the Modern system of ranked Shinto Shrines.

The shrine is located a seven-minute walk from Kazusa-Ichinomiya Station on the JR East Sotobō Line.

Gallery

Cultural Properties

National Important Cultural Properties
 , Kamakura period, designated National Important Cultural Property in 1953. The mirror has a diameter of 20.5 cm and a thickness of 3.5 cm, and is made of cupronickel (an alloy of copper and tin). The two small holes on the edge are presumed to indicate that this mirror was once hung in front of the shrine as a shintai. On the reverse side is a design of running water with an old plum tree on the right and pampas grass to the left, with two sparrows plating on the trunk, which is bending left. This is an idealized spring scene typical of the Kamakura period.

See also
 List of Shinto shrines
 Ichinomiya

References
 Plutschow, Herbe. Matsuri: The Festivals of Japan. RoutledgeCurzon (1996) 
 Ponsonby-Fane, Richard Arthur Brabazon. (1959).  The Imperial House of Japan. Kyoto: Ponsonby Memorial Society. OCLC 194887

External links

Notes

Beppyo shrines
Shinto shrines in Chiba Prefecture
Kazusa Province
Ichinomiya, Chiba
Ichinomiya